Ilyes Najim (born 10 September 2002) is a French professional footballer who plays as a forward for  club FBBP01 on loan from Caen.

Club career
On 1 June 2020, Najim signed a professional contract with SM Caen. Najim made his debut with Caen in a 1–1 Ligue 2 win over Pau FC on 3 April 2001.

On 5 July 2022, Najim was loaned to FBBP01.

References

External links
 
 SM Caen Profile

2002 births
Living people
French footballers
Association football forwards
Stade Malherbe Caen players
Football Bourg-en-Bresse Péronnas 01 players
Ligue 2 players
Championnat National 2 players